19th New York Film Critics Circle Awards
January 23, 1954(announced December 28, 1953)

From Here to Eternity

The 19th New York Film Critics Circle Awards, honored the best filmmaking of 1953.

Winners
Best Film:
From Here to Eternity
Best Actor:
Burt Lancaster - From Here to Eternity
Best Actress:
Audrey Hepburn - Roman Holiday
Best Director:
Fred Zinnemann - From Here to Eternity
Best Foreign Language Film:
Justice Is Done (Justice est faite) • France

References

External links
1953 Awards

1953
New York Film Critics Circle Awards, 1953
New York Film Critics Circle Awards
New York Film Critics Circle Awards
New York Film Critics Circle Awards
New York Film Critics Circle Awards